Herman "Lefty" Watts was an American baseball pitcher in the Negro leagues. He played in 1941 with the New York Black Yankees Jacksonville Red Caps, and in 1942 with the Cincinnati Buckeyes. Watts was involved in a car accident on September 7, 1942. Ulysses Brown and Smoky Owens died, while Watts, Eugene Bremmer, Alonzo Boone, and Wilbur Hayes were injured.

Watts returned to Indianapolis, becoming combination player-manager of the Indianapolis ABCs.

References

External links
 and Seamheads

New York Black Yankees players
Date of death missing
Date of birth missing
Baseball pitchers